Manzanillo Municipality or Municipality of Manzanillo (Spanish: Municipio Manzanillo) may refer to:

Manzanillo Municipality, Colima, Mexico
Manzanillo Municipality, Cuba, the municipality surrounding the city of Manzanillo, Granma Province

Municipality name disambiguation pages